Section 3 may refer to:

 Section 3 of the Canadian Charter of Rights and Freedoms
 Section 3 (NYSPHSAA), of the New York State Public High School Athletic Association
 Section 3 lands in the United States
 Section 3 of the Human Rights Act 1998
 Section 3 of the Constitution of Australia

See also

 MI3, British Military Intelligence Section 3